Soldier of Orange (Dutch: Soldaat van Oranje) is a Dutch musical production, based on the true story of resistance hero Erik Hazelhoff Roelfzema. In the 1970s, he wrote his experiences during World War II down in a book and director Paul Verhoeven made it into a 1977 film, starring actor Rutger Hauer.

The musical premiered on 30 October 2010, in a theatre that was purpose-built for the production: the TheaterHangaar on the former Valkenburg air base in Katwijk (in an old hangar). Queen Beatrix attended the premiere together with Erik Hazelhoff Roelfzema's widow, Karin.
Soldier of Orange is produced by NEW Productions, which is a subsidiary of investment company Amerborgh Nederland.

In the autumn of 2020, an English version of Soldier of Orange was set to premier in a newly build Royal Docks Theatre near London City Airport but the plans were postponed in March 2020 when the COVID-19 pandemic started.

Plot
Student Erik Hazelhoff Roelfzema and his friends are carefree, until the Germans invade the Netherlands in the early days of May 1940. The war changes everything. They can no longer take friendship and love for granted. Everybody has to make choices. Fight for the country and for freedom? Focus on studying and deny what's going on? Or join the enemy?

The book of Hazelhoff Roelfzema, with the title Cave of the Rattlesnake (Dutch: Het hol van de ratelslang), was published in 1970. It reappeared a year later under the title Soldier of Orange. Paul Verhoeven created a film version in 1977. Rutger Hauer played the character Erik Lanshoff, based on the resistance hero.

Soldier of Orange – The Musical brings the true story to the theatre. After World War II starts, Erik decides to flee to Britain. He smuggles transmitting equipment to the Netherlands and, as a pilot, is involved in bombing Germany. He becomes adjutant for Queen Wilhelmina and receives the Military William Order ('Militaire Willems-Orde'), the highest royal honour in the Netherlands, for his contribution to the resistance movement.

Background
Producer Fred Boot obtained the rights to turn the story into a musical in 2005, after meeting Hazelhoff Roelfzema the year before.

Scriptwriter Edwin de Vries wrote the musical script. American duo Tom Harriman and Pamela Philips Oland was responsible for composition and lyrics. Dutch actor and composer Frans van Deursen translated the lyrics from English into Dutch.
In 2008, Boot asked theatre producer Robin de Levita to join him. Director Theu Boermans joined the team in 2009.

Location
The show takes place in a former flight hangar, that is converted into a theatre. The location of the so-called TheaterHangaar is former military airport Valkenburg between Wassenaar, Katwijk en Leiden, a suitable, historical place. A foyer with a bar and restaurant is placed in front of the hangar.

SceneAround
Producer Robin de Levita invented a new theatrical performance solution for Soldier of Orange – The Musical: a rotating auditorium in the center of a venue with 1100 seats. He named it SceneAround. The auditorium is placed on a turntable. The audience rotates from scenery to scenery, accompanied by 180 degree projections on panel screens around the auditorium. Both the auditorium and the screens are motorized and automated. The set is built around the auditorium. Almost every scenery has its own set. There is even a ‘sea’ and the runway of the airport is also part of the set.

Dakota
Queen Wilhelmina returned to the Netherlands with a Dakota. The Dakota C-47 was made available for the musical by a Dutch museum and was taken to Valkenburg in August 2010. Shortly after midnight, the plane got stuck in an overpass. It was too damaged to have it repaired on time for the premiere. The Dakota PH-ALR ‘Reiger’ from 1939 that's being used in the production now, was delivered on 23 September 2010.

Cast

References
 http://www.avinteractive.co.uk/features/29801/case-study-dutch-masters
 http://goliath.ecnext.com/coms2/gi_0199-14115345/A-wheel-musical-treat-Dutch.html
 http://wingsofliberation.nl/index.php?option=com_content&view=article&id=141&Itemid=244&lang=en
 http://fohonline.com/index.php?option=com_content&task=view&id=5019&Itemid=1
 https://www.rijksoverheid.nl/actueel/nieuws/2010/11/01/koninklijke-premiere-soldaat-van-oranje

External links
 Official website

Theatre in the Netherlands
Dutch musicals
2010 musicals
Plays set in the Netherlands
Musicals based on films
Musicals based on novels
Musicals about World War II
Plays set in the 1930s
Plays set in the 1940s
Cultural depictions of spies
Cultural depictions of soldiers
Cultural depictions of Dutch men
Cultural depictions of Wilhelmina of the Netherlands